Brutal is the second studio album by Brazilian hard rock band Dr. Sin, released in 1995. With this album, Dr. Sin opened for such bands as Bon Jovi, AC/DC, Joe Satriani and Steve Vai.

Track listing

Japanese Version - Silent Scream

In Japan, the album was released in 1996 under the title of Silent Scream. The differences was in the order of the track listing, with one bonus song ("Futebol, Mulher E Rock n' Roll").

Track listing

References

Dr. Sin albums
1995 albums